Holzberger is a German language habitational surname. Notable people with the name include:

 Jordyn Holzberger (born 1993), Australian field hockey player
 Martin Holzberger (born 1968), officer of the Royal Australian Navy

References 

German-language surnames
German toponymic surnames